Papillifera solida, is a species of small, air-breathing land snail with a clausilium, a terrestrial pulmonate gastropod mollusk in the family Clausiliidae, the door snails. 

Subspecies
 Papillifera solida caietana (Rossmässler, 1842)
 Papillifera solida deburghiae (Paulucci, 1878)
 Papillifera solida diabolina H. Nordsieck, 2013
 Papillifera solida pseudobidens H. Nordsieck, 2013
 Papillifera solida solida<small>(Draparnaud, 1805) small>

References

 Bank, R. A.; Neubert, E. (2017). Checklist of the land and freshwater Gastropoda of Europe. Last update: July 16th, 2017.
 Kerney, M.P., Cameron, R.A.D. & Jungbluth, J-H. (1983). Die Landschnecken Nord- und Mitteleuropas. Ein Bestimmungsbuch für Biologen und Naturfreunde, 384 pp., 24 plates.

External links
 Draparnaud, J.-P.-R. (1805). Histoire naturelle des mollusques terrestres et fluviatiles de la France. 2 pp. (Avertissement a sa Majesté l'Impératrice), 2 pp. Rapport, i-viii (Préface), 1-164, pl. 1-13, 1 p. Errata.
 Papillifera solida at AnimalBase

Clausiliidae
Gastropods described in 1805